Al-Zamel is a surname. Notable people with the surname include:

 Adel al-Zamel (born 1963), Kuwaiti Guantanamo prisoner
 Ghassan al-Zamel (born 1963), Syrian politician

See also
 Záměl

Arabic-language surnames
Surnames of Arabic origin